Kevin John Gryboski (born November 15, 1973) is an American former Major League Baseball pitcher and current head coach of Wilkes University's baseball team.

Career

High school career 
At Bishop Hoban High School in Wilkes-Barre, Pennsylvania, Gryboski was a two-sport star in both baseball and basketball. In baseball, he was an All-Conference All-Star pick.

College career 
Gryboski pitched for Wilkes University in Wilkes-Barre, Pennsylvania.

Professional career 
Gryboski was selected by the Seattle Mariners in the 16th round of the 1995 Major League Baseball draft.

Gryboski, a right-handed pitcher, was acquired by the Atlanta Braves in January  and traded to the Texas Rangers in July  for minor league pitcher Matt Lorenzo. Gryboski was known as "Groundball" Gryboski while playing with the Braves; this came from his ability to get batters to ground into double plays.

He was once suspended by the Texas Rangers for "inappropriate actions".

Coaching 
In 2018, Gryboski became of head coach of the Wilkes University Colonels baseball team.

Personal life 
Along with pitching with the Wilkes Colonels, Gryboski also helps every year with the Wilkes baseball clinic for 6-12 year olds, where he teaches them the fundamentals of pitching. Gryboski is married to Leah and they have two children: KJ and Kaylee.

References

External links

Kevin Gryboski at Baseball Almanac
Kevin Gryboski - San Francisco Giants - MLB - Yahoo! Sports

1973 births
Living people
Major League Baseball pitchers
Baseball players from Pennsylvania
Atlanta Braves players
Sportspeople from Wilkes-Barre, Pennsylvania
Texas Rangers players
Washington Nationals players
Everett AquaSox players
Wisconsin Timber Rattlers players
Lancaster JetHawks players
Orlando Rays players
New Haven Ravens players
Tacoma Rainiers players
Macon Braves players
Richmond Braves players
Rome Braves players
Oklahoma RedHawks players
New Orleans Zephyrs players
Gulf Coast Pirates players
Indianapolis Indians players
Fresno Grizzlies players
Wilkes Colonels baseball players
American people of Polish descent